Mystrothrips is a genus of thrips in the family Phlaeothripidae.

Species
 Mystrothrips clavatoris
 Mystrothrips dammermani
 Mystrothrips dilatus
 Mystrothrips flavidus
 Mystrothrips levis
 Mystrothrips longantennus
 Mystrothrips nipponicus
 Mystrothrips reteanum

References

Phlaeothripidae
Thrips
Thrips genera